Amanda Kozak-Miliner (born July 28, 1984) is a pageant titleholder and educator from Warner Robins, Georgia who competed in the Miss America and Miss USA pageants. She is also the 2015 Georgia Teacher of the Year.

Pageants

Miss America
Kozak first competed in the Miss Georgia pageant in 2004 where she won a preliminary evening wear award made the top eleven. The following year representing as Miss Warner Robins 2005 she placed first runner-up to Monica Pang. Kozak represented Georgia in the Miss National Sweetheart pageant, a competition for Miss America state runners-up, in September 2005, and placed first runner-up.

In June 2006, after winning the Miss Valdosta local title, Kozak competed in the Miss Georgia pageant. She won preliminary awards in both the evening gown and swimsuit competitions and was crowned Miss Georgia on 25 June.  Her platform for the state pageant was "Positive Role Models Through Mentoring".

Kozak represented Georgia in the Miss America 2007 pageant held in Las Vegas, Nevada on 29 January 2007 and placed second runner-up to Lauren Nelson of Oklahoma. This was the second consecutive year that Georgia placed in the top three, as Pang had placed first runner-up at Miss America 2006. Kozak's talent was a tap dance performance, and her platform issue was Mentoring with the Big Brothers Big Sisters of America Organization. She was also a finalist for the Quality of Life award.

Kozak was given the key to the city of Valdosta by mayor John Fretti and signs were erected in Valdosta congratulating her on her win.

Miss USA
On November 10, 2007, she was crowned Miss Georgia USA 2008,  the first Georgian to win both state Miss America and Miss USA state titles.

She represented Georgia at the Miss USA 2008 pageant held on April 18 in Las Vegas, Nevada.  She did not place in the pageant, which was won by Crystle Stewart of Texas.

Georgia Teacher of the Year
On May 16, 2014, Amanda Miliner (previously Kozak) was named the 2015 Georgia Teacher of the Year at the annual banquet ceremony. The Georgia Teacher of the Year serves as an advocate for public education in Georgia.

Personal life
Kozak's parents were both in the military, and she stayed with friends in Georgia while they were simultaneously deployed, including a one-year deployment in Korea.  She is a graduate of Warner Robins High School, has a bachelor's degree in Early Childhood Education from Valdosta State University. At the time she held the Miss Georgia title she was working as a third-grade teacher.

References

External links
Miss Georgia USA official website
Miss Warner Robins official website
Georgia Teacher of the Year program official website

Miss America 2007 delegates
Miss USA 2008 delegates
Valdosta State University alumni
Living people
1984 births
People from Warner Robins, Georgia